Salter Springs, previously "Salter's Springs", is a small town situated west of Riverton and south of Woolshed Flat.

It was named for William Salter, who arrived in South Australia on the Caroline in 1839, and had a sheep station in the area. The town was surveyed in 1858. The school opened in 1867 and closed in 1956.

References 

Towns in South Australia
Mid North (South Australia)